Pavao Dragičević (1694 – 14 February 1773) was a Bosnian Franciscan friar and bishop.

Dragičević was born in Tješilo, a village near Fojnica in Ottoman Bosnia, and studied in present-day Italy. After the death of the first Bosnian apostolic vicar, Mato Delivić, Dragičević was nominated to the post by Vicko Zmajević, Archbishop of Zadar. Pope Benedict XIV approved the nomination on 14 November 1740. He was appointed bishop of Duvno on 15 December and consecrated by Zmajević on 29 June 1741.

Early in his vicariate, in  1741–1743, Dragičević made an extensive census of Catholic households in Bosnia and Herzegovina, which he sent to the Archbishop of Zadar. The census records, for which he is best known, have survived and present a valuable insight into 18th-century demographics of Bosnia and Herzegovina.

In 1752, Bishop Dragičević requested that the prophet Elijah replace George of Lydda as patron saint of "Bosnian Kingdom". The reason for his plea to the Holy See is not clear. He may have believed Elijah to be more suitable because of his importance to all three main religious groups in Bosnia and Herzegovina – Catholics, Muslims and Orthodox Christians. The Pope is said to have approved Dragičević's request with the remark that a wild nation deserved a wild patron. Neither the Bishop's letter nor the Pope's response have been made public by the Vatican Secret Archives.

Bishop Dragičević's vicariate was marked with political instability in Bosnia Eyalet. Since the Ottomans victory over the invading Habsburg Empire at the Battle of Banja Luka in 1737, Bosnian Muslims were becoming considerably less tolerant towards the Christians, but Dragičević was even more threatened by the ambitious Patriarch of Constantinople and Bosnian Orthodox clergy, who sought to expand their jurisdiction over the Catholics. In 1743, Dragičević was imprisoned in Fojnica, and his life was often in peril. He thus requested to be relieved of his duties in 1766, which was granted on 30 June. Succeeded by Marijan Bogdanović, Dragičević retired to the Franciscan monastery in Fojnica. Despite illness, he was forced to resume administration of the vicariate between Bogdanović's death in 1772 and the appointment of his successor. Dragičević died on 14 February 1773 and was buried in the Franciscan church in Fojnica.

References 

1694 births
1793 deaths
People from Fojnica
Croats of Bosnia and Herzegovina
Franciscans of the Franciscan Province of Bosnia
Bishops of Duvno
Apostolic vicars
Bishops appointed by Pope Benedict XIV
18th-century Roman Catholic bishops in the Ottoman Empire
Bosnia and Herzegovina Roman Catholic bishops